The Louis-Jeantet Foundation was set up in Geneva in 1982 according to the wish of the Geneva-resident French businessman Louis Jeantet, having been endowed with his fortune upon his death from cancer in 1981. The Foundation commenced activities in 1983.

It funds the Louis-Jeantet Prize, and a number of professorships at the Faculty of Medicine of the University of Geneva.

The grounds of Geneva's Fondation Louis-Jeantet contain a 15 by 15 sq. m. courtyard within a sunken hortus conclusus (i.e. an enclosed garden) with an area of about 1300 sq. m.

References

External links
 

Foundations based in Switzerland
Organisations based in Geneva